David Owen Brown (born 8 December 1982 in Burnley, Lancashire) is an English first-class cricketer. He is a right-handed batsman and right-armed medium bowler.

Early life
Brown was born in Burnley, Lancashire, attending Queen Elizabeth's Grammar School in neighbouring Blackburn. Like many of his family, he began playing cricket for Burnley Cricket Club.
His older brother, Michael, played for Surrey.

Career
Brown played for Gloucestershire County Cricket Club from 2006 until 2009. At the end of the 2009 season Brown joined Glamorgan County Cricket Club. He has also represented Durham UCCE, British Universities and Lancashire 2nd XI.

References

1982 births
Living people
Cricketers from Burnley
English cricketers
Glamorgan cricketers
Gloucestershire cricketers
Durham MCCU cricketers
People educated at Queen Elizabeth's Grammar School, Blackburn
Alumni of Durham University
British Universities cricketers